Arthur Lewis Newton (January 31, 1883 – July 19, 1950) was an American athlete who competed mainly in the distance events. He was born in Upton, Massachusetts and died in Worcester, Massachusetts.

Biography
He participated in the 1900 Summer Olympics in Paris in the 2,500 metre steeplechase finishing 4th and in the marathon finishing 5th.

He also competed for the United States in the 1904 Summer Olympics held in St. Louis, United States in the 4 mile team where he won the gold medal with his teammates George Underwood, Paul Pilgrim, 800 meter silver medalist Howard Valentine, and David Munson.  He also won bronze medals in the marathon and 2,590 meter steeplechase.

He was married twice; his second wife was Frieda Muehlichen, and their daughter was Elaine.

References

External links 

1883 births
1956 deaths
People from Upton, Massachusetts
Sportspeople from Worcester County, Massachusetts
American male middle-distance runners
American male long-distance runners
American male marathon runners
American male steeplechase runners
Olympic gold medalists for the United States in track and field
Olympic bronze medalists for the United States in track and field
Athletes (track and field) at the 1900 Summer Olympics
Athletes (track and field) at the 1904 Summer Olympics
Medalists at the 1904 Summer Olympics